Christian Nicolau (born 3 February 1947) is a French former athlete who competed in the 1968 Summer Olympics.

References

1947 births
Sportspeople from La Tronche
Living people
Olympic athletes of France
Athletes (track and field) at the 1968 Summer Olympics
French male sprinters
European Athletics Championships medalists
Universiade bronze medalists for France
Universiade medalists in athletics (track and field)
Medalists at the 1970 Summer Universiade
20th-century French people
21st-century French people